David McConaughy (September 29, 1775 – January 29, 1852) was the fourth president of Washington College from 1831 to 1852.

Early life 
McConaughy was born in York County, now Adams County, Pennsylvania.

Education 
He graduated from Dickinson College in 1795 and went on to be the pastor of a church in Gettysburg, Pennsylvania.

Career 
McConaughy was elected president of Washington College on December 21, 1831.  During his presidency Washington College expanded from one building to two with the construction of a new building.  Also the number of graduates increased from three in 1832 to over fifty in 1849, his last year in office.  McConaughy also helped organize and was appointed a Trustee of the Washington Female Seminary, which was established in 1837 near the College campus.  In 1847 interest in uniting the two colleges of Jefferson and Washington again arose and  although no action resulted, relations between the two colleges were friendly and it appeared that "The College War" was over.  McConaughy resigned as president October 12, 1849, at the age of 74.

Death 
He died January 29, 1852, in Washington, Pennsylvania.

Works

References 

Dickinson College alumni
Presidents of Washington & Jefferson College
People from Adams County, Pennsylvania
1775 births
1852 deaths